Froilán Tantaleán (born 1899, date of death unknown) was a Peruvian sports shooter. He competed in the 25 m pistol event at the 1948 Summer Olympics.

References

1899 births
Year of death missing
Peruvian male sport shooters
Olympic shooters of Peru
Shooters at the 1948 Summer Olympics
Place of birth missing